Battle Stations is a video game developed and published by Electronic Arts for the PlayStation and Sega Saturn in 1997. It was labeled as "a 32-bit upgrade to the Intellivision classic Sea Battle".

Reception

The PlayStation version received mixed reviews. Next Generation said, "As much fun as it can be, [the game's] depth just doesn't measure up to even its low-res ancestor over the long haul."

Notes

References

External links
 Official game website
 

1997 video games
Electronic Arts games
Naval video games
PlayStation (console) games
Sega Saturn games